Dušan Đurišič (born 13 March 1961) is a Slovenian cross-country skier. He competed in the men's 15 kilometre event at the 1984 Winter Olympics.

References

1961 births
Living people
Slovenian male cross-country skiers
Olympic cross-country skiers of Yugoslavia
Cross-country skiers at the 1984 Winter Olympics
Sportspeople from Jesenice, Jesenice